Kingsway Hospital was a mental health facility in Derby, England.

History
The hospital, which was designed by Benjamin Jacobs using a dual courtyard layout, opened as the Derby Borough Asylum in November 1888. An additional block was completed in 1891, a private annex for fee-paying patients, known as Albany House, was added in 1903 and a nurses' home, known as Bramble House, was completed in 1931. It became Derby Mental Hospital in 1912 and Kingsway Hospital in 1938 before joining the National Health Service in 1948.

After the introduction of Care in the Community in the early 1980s, the hospital went into a period of decline and patient numbers reduced significantly. In the late 1990s eleven men died in unusual circumstances at the hospital: an inquiry led by Sir Richard Rougier found that food and drink had been deliberately withheld. The hospital finally closed in December 2009. Most of the buildings have since been demolished and the site redeveloped by Kier Group as Manor Kingsway. Bramble House, one of the few surviving buildings, was sold for commercial development in 2018.

References

Hospital buildings completed in 1888
Hospitals established in 1888
1888 establishments in England
2009 disestablishments in England
Hospitals disestablished in 2009
Defunct hospitals in England
Former psychiatric hospitals in England
Hospitals in Derby